Rodrigo Hernández Cascante (born 22 June 1996), known as Rodri or Rodrigo, is a Spanish professional footballer who plays as a defensive midfielder for  club Manchester City and the Spain national team.

Rodri is a Spain international and former youth international. He made his debut for the senior national team in 2018 and has since represented his country at the UEFA Euro 2020 and 2022 FIFA World Cup.

Club career

Villarreal
Born in Madrid, Rodri joined Atlético Madrid's youth setup in 2007 aged 11, from CF Rayo Majadahonda. Released in 2013 due to a "lack of physical strength", he subsequently signed with Villarreal CF.

On 7 February 2015, while still a junior, Rodri made his senior debut for the reserves, coming on as a late substitute in a 3–1 away win against RCD Espanyol B in the Segunda División B. He was handed his first start 15 days later, in a 2–0 victory at Real Zaragoza B.

Rodri made his first-team debut on 17 December 2015, starting in a 2–0 home win against SD Huesca for that season's Copa del Rey. His first La Liga appearance was on 17 April 2016, when he came on as a second-half substitute for Denis Suárez in a 2–1 away loss to Rayo Vallecano.

On 4 December 2017, having already established himself as a regular, Rodri renewed his contract until 2022. He scored his first goal in the Spanish top level on 18 February 2018, the opener in a 1–1 away draw against RCD Espanyol.

Atlético Madrid
On 24 May 2018, Rodri returned to Atlético after the club reached an agreement with Villarreal for his transfer. He signed a five-year contract with the Madrid side, for a fee in the region of €20 million plus 5 million in variables. He made his debut on 15 August in the 2018 UEFA Super Cup in Tallinn, playing the first 71 minutes of a 4–2 extra-time win over city rivals Real Madrid.

Manchester City

2019–20 season
On 3 July 2019, Manchester City met the terms of Rodri's £62.6 million release clause, enabling him to buy out the remainder of his contract with Atlético and leave the club. The transfer was a new record transfer fee paid by Manchester City. He signed a five-year contract.

Rodri made his debut in the 2019 FA Community Shield on 4 August at Wembley Stadium, playing the full 90 minutes as City won on penalties against Liverpool after a 1–1 draw. He made his Premier League debut against West Ham United six days later in a 5–0 away win, and on 14 September he scored his first goal as consolation in a 3–2 away defeat by Norwich City.

It was announced in October 2019 that he would be out for a month due to a hamstring injury.

On 1 March 2020, City won the EFL Cup at Wembley Stadium for the third time in a row, beating Aston Villa 2–1 in the final. Rodri headed in City's second goal from a corner, which ultimately turned out to be the winner.

2020–21 season
On 13 February 2021, Rodri scored City's first goal from a penalty in a 3–0 home win over Tottenham Hotspur.

2021–22 season
Over the course of the 2021–22 domestic campaign, Rodri had the highest pass completion rate of any midfielder in the Premier League, with 91.8% successful passes per 90 mins, and had proved to be integral to City's title win.

2022–23 season
On 12 July 2022, Rodri agreed a new deal to extend his contract with Manchester City until 2027.

International career
After playing for Spain at under-16, under-19 and under-21 levels, Rodri was first selected by the full side on 16 March 2018 for two friendlies with Germany and Argentina. He made his debut five days later, replacing Thiago Alcântara late in the 1–1 draw against Germany in Düsseldorf.

Rodri was included in Luis Enrique's 24-man squad for UEFA Euro 2020 and 2022 FIFA World Cup.

Career statistics

Club

International

Spain score listed first, score column indicates score after each Rodri goal

Honours
Atlético Madrid
UEFA Super Cup: 2018

Manchester City
Premier League: 2020–21, 2021–22
EFL Cup: 2019–20, 2020–21
FA Community Shield: 2019
UEFA Champions League runner-up: 2020–21

Spain U19
UEFA European Under-19 Championship: 2015

Spain U21
UEFA European Under-21 Championship runner-up: 2017

Spain
UEFA Nations League runner-up: 2020–21

Individual
Premier League Goal of the Month: November 2021

References

External links

Profile at the Manchester City F.C. website

1996 births
Living people
Footballers from Madrid
Spanish footballers
Association football midfielders
Villarreal CF B players
Villarreal CF players
Atlético Madrid footballers
Manchester City F.C. players
Segunda División B players
La Liga players
Premier League players
Spain youth international footballers
Spain under-21 international footballers
Spain international footballers
UEFA Euro 2020 players
2022 FIFA World Cup players
Spanish expatriate footballers
Expatriate footballers in England
Spanish expatriate sportspeople in England